Agyneta similis is a species of sheet weaver found in Finland, Iceland, Kazakhstan and Russia. It was described by Kulczynski in 1926.

References

similis
Spiders of Europe
Spiders of Asia
Spiders described in 1926